Grammar School Rawalpindi (GSR) is a high school which is located in Rawalpindi, Pakistan. 

It has separate junior and senior section buildings in Chaklala and Lalazar and a primary section at Rah-e-aman, Adiala road.

The school prepares students for the Secondary school Certificate (Matriculation) examination conducted by the Rawalpindi board of intermediate and secondary education at its Chaklala and Lalzar branches, and for O levels examinations of the University of London at its Chaklala branch.

History
The school was founded in 1986 by Nasreen Iqbal.

In 2002, the school received UNESCO Peace Pillar Award.

References

Schools in Rawalpindi
1986 establishments in Pakistan